Najdorf may refer to:

 Miguel Najdorf, Polish-born Argentine chess grandmaster
 Sicilian Defence, Najdorf Variation, chess opening used by Miguel Najdorf